The 2013 European Athletics U23 Championships were the 9th edition of the biennial athletics competition between European athletes under the age of twenty-three. It was held in Tampere, Finland from 10 to 14 July.

Russia topped the medal table with 20 medals in total, including 8 golds, before Great Britain and Germany.

Medal summary

Men

Women

Medal table

Participation
According to an unofficial count, 934 athletes from 45 countries participated in the event.

References

External links

Official website (archived)
EAA competition website
2013 European Athletics U23 Championships Results

 
2013
International athletics competitions hosted by Finland
European Athletics U23 Championships
Athletics U23
European Athletics U23 Championships
Sports competitions in Tampere
2013 in youth sport